There are about 110 species of reptiles in Singapore. Most of them are small or rarely seen. But there are a few which are large or prominent. The largest reptiles which can be found in Singapore are the estuarine crocodile and the reticulated python. The ones most commonly seen in urban areas are the house geckos (typically called house lizard by the lay-person) and the non-native changeable lizard. The changeable lizard has pushed the local green crested lizard into forested areas.

In gardens and parks, one can often see common sun skinks, the introduced red-eared sliders and flying lizards.

Water monitors are common in rivers and mangrove. Another monitor that can be found in Singapore is the clouded monitor, which is a forest species. It is smaller than the Malayan water monitor, has slit nostrils and is paler in colour. In 2008, the Dumeril's monitor was rediscovered in the Central Catchment Nature Reserve. This goes to show that there can still be surprises in the forests of Singapore.

Equatorial spitting cobras can still be found in desolated urban areas of Singapore. The bigger king cobra is much rarer. The banded krait sometimes show up as road kills. There are also 2 coral snake and 9 sea snake species.

List of reptiles

Order Crocodylia (crocodilians)

Family Crocodylidae (crocodiles)
Estuarine crocodile (Crocodylus porosus) - formerly widespread, recent sightings in Sungei Buloh Wetland Reserve, Kranji, Lim Chu Kang, Woodlands Waterfront, Sembawang, Lower Seletar Reservoir, Pasir Ris, Changi, East Coast

Family Gavialidae (gharials)
False gharial (Tomistoma schlegelii) - Possible escaped juvenile caught in Pasir Ris in 1991

Order Squamata (lizards and snakes)

Family Eublepharidae (eyelid geckos)
Fox-faced gecko (Aeluroscalabotes felinus) - Central Catchment Nature Reserve

Family Gekkonidae (geckos)
Peninsular rock gecko (Cnemaspis peninsularis) - Bukit Timah Nature Reserve, Central Catchment Nature Reserve, Pulau Tekong
Singapore bent-toed gecko (Cyrtodactylus majulah) - Central Catchment Nature Reserve
Panti bent-toed gecko (Cyrtodactylyus pantiensis) - Pulau Tekong
Marbled bent-toed gecko (Cyrtodactylus quadrivirgatus) - Central Catchment Nature Reserve
Peninsular bent-toed gecko (Cyrtodactylus semenanjungensis) - Central Catchment Nature Reserve
Peter's forest gecko (Cyrtodactylus consobrinus) - Bukit Timah Nature Reserve
Four-clawed gecko (Gehyra mutilata) - common and widespread
Brown's flap-legged gecko (Gekko browni) - Pulau Tekong
Tokay gecko (Gekko gecko) - introduced
Horsfield's flying gecko (Gekko horsfieldii) - indeterminate
Kuhl's flying gecko (Gekko kuhli) - Pulau Tekong
Spotted house gecko (Gekko monarchus) - common and widespread
Large forest gecko (Gekko hulk) - Bukit Timah Nature Reserve, Central Catchment Nature Reserve (possibly extirpated)
Frilly gecko (Hemidactylus craspedotus) - Bukit Timah Nature Reserve, Central Catchment Nature Reserve
Flat-tailed gecko (Hemidactylus platyurus) - common and widespread
Brooke's house gecko (Hemidactylus brookii) - likely introduced
Common house gecko (Hemidactylus frenatus) - common and widespread
Indo-Pacific gecko (Hemidactylus garnotii) - indeterminate
Lowland dwarf gecko (Hemiphyllodactylus typus) - Central Catchment Nature Reserve, Western Catchment, Mandai Mangroves, Pasir Ris, Bidadari
Mourning gecko (Lepidodactylus lugubris) - widespread in coastal habitats

Family Agamidae (agamids)
Earless agamid (Aphaniotis fusca) - Bukit Timah Nature Reserve, Central Catchment Nature Reserve
Green crested lizard (Bronchocela cristatella)
Siamese blue crested lizard (Calotes goetzi) - introduced, Sungei Tengah
Changeable lizard (Calotes versicolor) - introduced, common and widespread
Black-bearded flying lizard (Draco melanopogon) - Bukit Timah Nature Reserve, Central Catchment Nature Reserve
Five-banded flying lizard (Draco quinquefasciatus) - Bukit Timah Nature Reserve, Central Catchment Nature Reserve
Common gliding lizard (Draco sumatranus) - common and widespread on Singapore Island, Pulau Ubin, Pulau Tekong
Orange-bearded flying lizard (Draco abbreviatus) - indeterminate
Red-edged flying lizard (Draco formosus) - indeterminate
Peninsular horned tree lizard (Acanthosaura armata) - indeterminate
Bell's anglehead lizard (Gonocephalus bellii) - indeterminate

Family Dactyloidae (anoles)
Brown anole (Norops sagrei) - introduced, breeding population in Gardens by the Bay and Jurong Lake Gardens, individuals spotted in Bishan, Tanah Merah, Punggol, Singapore Botanic Gardens

Family Iguanidae (iguanas)
Green iguana (Iguana iguana) - introduced, breeding populations in Jurong Hill, Jurong Bird Park, Sungei Tengah, Choa Chu Kang, escapees occasionally seen elsewhere

Family Scincidae (skinks)

Olive tree skink (Dasia olivacea) - Bukit Timah Nature Reserve, Central Catchment Nature Reserve, Pulau Ubin
Brown tree skink (Dasia grisea) - Bukit Timah Nature Reserve, Central Catchment Nature Reserve
Mangrove skink (Emoia atrocostata) - Sungei Buloh Wetland Reserve, Mandai Mangroves, Pulau Tekong
Many-lined sun skink (Eutropis multifasciata) - common and widespread
Striped sun skink (Eutropis rugifera) - Bukit Timah Nature Reserve, Central Catchment Nature Reserve
Striped tree skink (Lipinia vittigera) - Bukit Timah Nature Reserve, Central Catchment Nature Reserve
Short-limbed supple skink (Lygosoma siamensis) - possibly introduced - Singapore Botanic Gardens
Garden supple skink (Subdoluseps bowringii) - common and widespread
Singapore swamp skink (Tytthoscincus temasekensis) - Central Catchment Nature Reserve

Family Varanidae (monitor lizards)

Clouded monitor (Varanus nebulosus) - Bukit Timah Nature Reserve, Central Catchment Nature Reserve, Bukit Batok Nature Park, Singapore Botanic Gardens, Pulau Ubin, Pulau Tekong
Dumeril's monitor (Varanus dumerilii) - very rarely seen, Nee Soon swamp forest
Malayan water monitor (Varanus salvator) - common and widespread in habitats close to water

Family Typhlopidae (blind snakes)
Brahminy blind snake (Indotyphlops braminus)
Striped blind snake (Ramphotyphlops lineatus)
White-belled blind snake (Argyrophis muelleri) - Central Catchment Nature Reserve, Pulau Ubin

Family Cylindrophiidae (Asian pipe snakes)
Red-tailed pipe snake (Cylindrophis ruffus)

Family Xenopeltidae (sunbeam snakes)
Sunbeam snake (Xenopeltis unicolor) - common and widespread

Family Pythonidae (pythons)
Malaysian blood python (Python brongersmai) - extirpated
Reticulated python (Malayopython reticulatus) - common and widespread

Family Acrochordidae (file snakes)

Banded file snake (Acrochordus granulatus) - Straits of Johor, Pulau Semakau

Family Colubridae (colubrids)

Subfamily Sibynophiinae
Black-headed collared snake (Sibynophis melanocephalus) - Bukit Timah Nature Reserve, Central Catchment Nature Reserve, Western Catchment, Kranji, Pulau Ubin, Pulau Tekong

Subfamily Natricinae
Peter's keelback (Amphiesma petersii) - indeterminate
Southern chequered keelback (Fowlea flavipunctatus) - introduced
Blue-necked keelback (Rhabdophis rhodomelas)
Red-necked keelback (Rhabdophis subminiatus) - indeterminate
Spotted keelback (Xenochrophis maculatus) - Bukit Timah Nature Reserve, Central Catchment Nature Reserve
Triangle keelback (Xenochrophis trianguligerus) - Central Catchment Nature Reserve
Striped keelback (Xenochrophis vittatus) - introduced

Subfamily Calamariinae
Red-bellied reed snake (Calamaria albiventer) - indeterminate
Gimlett's reed snake (Calamaria gimletti) - Central Catchment Nature Reserve
Variable reed snake (Calamaria lumbricoidea) - Bukit Timah Nature Reserve, Central Catchment Nature Reserve
Pink-headed reed snake (Calamaria schlegeli) - Bukit Timah Nature Reserve, Central Catchment Nature Reserve
Dwarf reed snake (Pseudorabdion longiceps) - Bukit Timah Nature Reserve, Central Catchment Nature Reserve, Pulau Ubin, Pulau Tekong

Subfamily Ahaetullinae
Speckle-headed whip snake (Ahaetulla fasciolata) - Bukit Timah Nature Reserve, Singapore Botanic Gardens
Malayan whip snake (Ahaetulla mycterizans) - Bukit Timah Nature Reserve, Central Catchment Nature Reserve
Oriental whip snake (Ahaetulla prasina) - common and widespread
Golden tree snake (Chrysopelea ornata ) - introduced, individuals seen at Shenton Way, Gardens by the Bay, Lim Chu Kang
Paradise tree snake (Chrysopelea paradisi) - common and widespread
Twin-barred tree snake (Chrysopelea pelias) - Bukit Timah Nature Reserve, Central Catchment Nature Reserve, Pulau Ubin
Striped bronzeback (Dendrelaphis caudolineatus) - common and widespread
Blue bronzeback (Dendrelaphis cyanochloris) - Bukit Timah Nature Reserve, Central Catchment Nature Reserve
Elegant bronzeback (Dendrelaphis formosus) - Bukit Timah Nature Reserve, Central Catchment Nature Reserve
Haas' bronzeback (Dendrelaphis haasi) - Central Catchment Nature Reserve
Kopstein's bronzeback (Dendrelaphis kopsteini) - Bukit Timah Nature Reserve, Central Catchment Nature Reserve
Painted bronzeback (Dendrelaphis pictus) - common and widespread
Keel-bellied whip snake (Dryophiops rubescens) - Bukit Timah Nature Reserve, Central Catchment Nature Reserve, Western Catchment, Pulau Ubin, Pulau Tekong

Subfamily Colubrinae
Dog-toothed cat snake (Boiga cynodon) - Bukit Timah Nature Reserve, Central Catchment Nature Reserve, Pulau Ubin, Pulau Tekong
Gold-ringed cat snake (Boiga melanota) - Bukit Timah Nature Reserve, Central Catchment Nature Reserve, Mandai Mangroves, Pulau Ubin, Pulau Tekong, St. John's Island, Pulau Semakau
White-spotted cat snake (Boiga drapiezii) - Central Catchment Nature Reserve
Jasper cat snake (Boiga jaspidea) - Central Catchment Nature Reserve, Pulau Tekong
Common Malayan racer (Coelognathus flavolineatus)
Copperhead racer (Coelognathus radiatus) - indeterminate
Malayan bridle snake (Dryocalamus subannulatus) - Bukit Timah Nature Reserve, Central Catchment Nature Reserve
Orange-bellied ringneck (Gongylosoma baliodeira) - Bukit Timah Nature Reserve, Central Catchment Nature Reserve
Rainbow tree snake (Gonyophis margaritatus) - indeterminate
Red-tailed racer (Gonyosoma oxycephalum)- Bukit Timah Nature Reserve, Central Catchment Nature Reserve, Pulau Tekong
Tricoloured ringneck (Liopeltis tricolor)
House wolf snake (Lycodon capucinus) - common and widespread
Banded wolf snake (Lycodon subcinctus) - Central Catchment Nature Reserve, Pulau Tekong
Brown kukri snake (Oligodon purpurascens) - Bukit Timah Nature Reserve, Central Catchment Nature Reserve
Striped kukri snake (Oligodon octolineatus) - common and widespread
Barred kukri snake (Oligodon signatus) - Bukit Timah Nature Reserve, Central Catchment Nature Reserve
Striped racer (Orthriophis taeniurus) - indeterminate, historically recorded from Pulau Ubin
Keeled rat snake (Ptyas carinata) - Bukit Timah Nature Reserve, Central Catchment Nature Reserve
White-bellied rat snake (Ptyas fusca) - Bukit Timah Nature Reserve, Central Catchment Nature Reserve
Indochinese rat snake (Ptyas korros)
Banded rat snake (Ptyas mucosa) - indeterminate
Malaysian brown snake (Xenelaphis hexagonotus) - Bukit Timah Nature Reserve, Central Catchment Nature Reserve

Family Homalopsidae (mud snakes)
Keel-bellied water snake (Bitia hydroides) - indeterminate
Cantor's water snake (Cantoria violacea)
Dog-faced water snake (Cerberus schneiderii) - Straits of Johor, Pulau Semakau
Rainbow water snake (Enhydris enhydris) - likely introduced
Crab-eating water snake (Fordonia leucobalia)
Yellow-lipped water snake (Gerarda prevostiana)
Puff-faced water snake (Homalopsis buccata)
Blackwater mud snake (Phytolopsis punctata) - Central Catchment Nature Reserve
Selangor mud snake (Raclitia indica) - Central Catchment Nature Reserve

Family Lamprophiidae (mock vipers)
Painted mock viper (Psammodynastes pictus) - Central Catchment Nature Reserve

Family Elapidae (cobras, coral snakes, kraits, sea snakes)

Malayan krait (Bungarus candidus) - indeterminate
Banded krait (Bungarus fasciatus)
Blue Malayan coral snake (Calliophis bivirgatus)
Spotted Malayan coral snake (Calliophis gracilis) - indeterminate
Banded Malayan coral snake (Calliophis intestinalis)
Equatorial spitting cobra (Naja sumatrana) - common and widespread
King cobra (Ophiophagus hannah)
Yellow-lipped sea krait (Laticauda colubrina) - Singapore Strait
Marbled sea snake (Aipysurus eydouxii) - Straits of Johor
Short sea snake (Hydrophis curtus)
Blue-banded sea snake (Hydrophis cyanocinctus)
Striped sea snake (Hydrophis fasciatus)
Small-headed sea snake (Hydrophis gracilis)
Kloss' sea snake (Hydrophis klossi)
Horned sea snake (Hydrophis peronii)
Yellow-bellied sea snake (Hydrophis platurus)
Beaked sea snake (Hydrophis schistosus)
Stoke's sea snake (Hydrophis stokesii)

Family Pareidae (slug-eating snakes)
White-spotted slug snake (Pareas margaritophorus) - introduced
Smooth slug snake (Asthenodipsas laevis) - Central Catchment Nature Reserve

Family Viperidae (vipers)
Mangrove pit-viper (Trimeresurus purpureomaculatus) - Sungei Buloh Wetland Reserve, Pasir Ris, Pulau Ubin, Pulau Semakau
Hagen's pit-viper (Trimeresurus hageni) - indeterminate
Wagler's pit-viper (Tropidolaemus wagleri) - Bukit Timah, Central Catchment, Lim Chu Kang

Order Testudines (turtles, tortoises, terrapins)

Family Cheloniidae (sea turtles)
Loggerhead turtle (Caretta caretta) - vagrant, confiscated individuals released at Sentosa
Green turtle (Chelonia mydas) - Singapore Strait
Hawksbill turtle (Eretmochelys imbricata) - Singapore Strait, recorded nesting on East Coast and Southern Islands
Olive ridley turtle (Lepidochelys olivacea) - confiscated individuals released at Sentosa, carcass found at East Coast

Family Dermochelyidae (leatherback turtle)
Leatherback turtle (Dermochelys coriacea) - vagrant

Family Chelydridae (snapping turtles)
Common snapping turtle (Chelydra serpentina sensu lato) - escapee
Alligator snapping turtle (Macrochelys temminckii sensu lato) - escapee

Family Kinosternidae (mud turtles)
Razor-backed musk turtle (Sternotherus carinatus) - escapee

Family Trionychidae (softshell turtles)
Asian softshell turtle (Amyda cartilaginea) - Central Catchment Nature Reserve, populations elsewhere likely to be escapees or introduced
Indochinese softshell turtle (Amyda ornata) - introduced
Forest softshell turtle (Dogania subplana) - Central Catchment Nature Reserve
Indian flapshell turtle (Lissemys punctata) - escapee
Wattle-necked softshell turtle (Palea steindachneri) - escapee
Asian giant softshell turtle (Pelochelys cantorii) - indeterminate
Chinese softshell turtle (Pelodiscus sinensis sensu lato) - introduced

Family Carettochelyidae (pig-nosed turtle)
Pig-nosed turtle (Carettochelys insculpta) - escapee

Family Geoemydidae (Asian terrapins)
Southern river terrapin (Batagur affinis) - likely former native but since extirpated, recent local records likely to be escapees
Painted terrapin (Batagur borneoensis) - indeterminate, recent local records likely to be escapees
Malayan box terrapin (Cuora amboinensis) - local populations likely to be a mixture of native and introduced individuals
Asian leaf terrapin (Cyclemys dentata) - Central Catchment Nature Reserve, Western Catchment
Giant Asian pond terrapin (Heosemys grandis) - introduced
Spiny terrapin (Heosemys spinosa) - Bukit Timah Nature Reserve, Central Catchment Nature Reserve
Chinese stripe-necked turtle (Mauremys sinensis) - escapee
Malayan flat-shelled terrapin (Notochelys platynota) - Central Catchment Nature Reserve, Western Catchment
Malayan giant terrapin (Orlitia borneensis) - indeterminate, recent local records likely to be escapees
Black marsh terrapin (Siebenrockiella crassicollis) - likely introduced

Family Testudinidae (tortoises)
Asian brown tortoise (Manouria emys) - escapee
Indian star tortoise (Geochelone elegans) - escapee

Family Emydidae (American terrapins)
Cuban slider (Trachemys decussata) - escapee
Red-eared slider (Trachemys scripta elegans) - introduced, common and widespread
Florida cooter (Pseudemys concinna floridana) - escapee

Family Podocnemididae (side-necked turtles)
Yellow-spotted river turtle (Podocnemis unifilis) - escapee

Family Chelidae (side-necked turtles)
Matamata (Chelus fimbriata) - escapee

See also
List of mammals of Singapore
List of birds of Singapore
List of amphibians of Singapore

References

External links 
 Official list of known reptiles in Singapore  from Singaporean National Parks Board
 
 

Reptiles
Singapore
Singapore